Dino Fava Passaro (born 16 March 1977) is an Italian footballer. He plays as a striker for Savoia.

Career 

Fava started his career at Formia in Serie C2. He was signed by S.S.C. Napoli in summer 1996. He was loaned to Acireale of Serie C1 in the summer of 1997, joining Serie C2's Pro Patria during the 1999–2000 season, and Varese in Serie C1 the next year.

In summer 2002, Triestina of Serie B signed Fava in joint-ownership bid, and he finished runner-up top scorer in 2002-03. In the summer, he permanently transferred to Udinese, where he made his Serie A debut on 21 September 2003, against Bologna.

In summer 2005, newly promoted Serie A team Treviso signed Fava in joint-ownership bid. Although only scored 3 league goals, he earned a permanent move in June 2006.

In August 2007, Fava transferred to Bologna (then in the second division), in another joint-ownership bid, for €900,000. He was bought back in June 2008 for €900,000.

In July 2008, Fava joined newly promoted Serie B team Salernitana. After the bankruptcy of Treviso, he joined Salernitana in September, signed a 2-year contract.

In August 2011 he joined Paganese.

References

External links 

  Player stats at Gazzetta.it
  Dino Fava at Tuttocalciatori

1977 births
Living people
People from Formia
Italian footballers
S.S.C. Napoli players
Aurora Pro Patria 1919 players
S.S.D. Varese Calcio players
U.S. Triestina Calcio 1918 players
Udinese Calcio players
Treviso F.B.C. 1993 players
Bologna F.C. 1909 players
U.S. Salernitana 1919 players
S.S. Formia Calcio players
Serie A players
Serie B players
Serie C players
Serie D players
Association football forwards
Footballers from Lazio
Sportspeople from the Province of Latina